The 1984 Senator Windows Professional Snooker League was a  professional non-ranking snooker tournament that was played from November 1983 to April 1984.

John Virgo topped the table and won the tournament. Kirk Stevens withdrew during the tournament, leaving some matches unplayed. Due to financial issues, the tournament was not played again until the format was revived in 1987 by Matchroom Sport.


League table

If points were level then most draws, then most frames won determined their positions. If two players had an identical record then the result in their match determined their positions. If that ended 4–4 then the player who got to four first was higher. Stevens did not complete his matches and matches involving him were removed from consideration for the league table.

Match results

 Tony Knowles 7–3 Bill Werbeniuk
 John Spencer 5–5 Jimmy White
 Eddie Charlton 5–5 Bill Werbeniuk
 Tony Knowles 6–4 David Taylor
 John Spencer 6–4 Kirk Stevens
 Bill Werbeniuk 6–4 David Taylor
 Eddie Charlton 6–4 Doug Mountjoy
 Ray Reardon 5–5 John Spencer
 Ray Reardon 5–5 David Taylor
 Dennis Taylor 6–4 Doug Mountjoy
 John Virgo 6–4 David Taylor
 Jimmy White 6–4 Kirk Stevens
 Dennis Taylor 8–2 Eddie Charlton
 Eddie Charlton 6–4 Ray Reardon
 Eddie Charlton 7–3 John Spencer
 Alex Higgins 5–5 Tony Knowles
 Alex Higgins 6–4 Doug Mountjoy
 Tony Knowles 5–5 Ray Reardon
 Tony Knowles 5–5 Dennis Taylor
 Doug Mountjoy 5–5 Ray Reardon
 Doug Mountjoy 7–3 Kirk Stevens
 John Spencer 6–4 Alex Higgins
 John Spencer 7–3 Bill Werbeniuk
 John Spencer 8–2 Doug Mountjoy
 Kirk Stevens 6–4 Tony Knowles
 Kirk Stevens 6–4 Alex Higgins
 David Taylor 6–4 John Spencer
 Dennis Taylor 6–4 Bill Werbeniuk
 Dennis Taylor 7–3 David Taylor
 John Virgo 6–4 Alex Higgins
 John Virgo 6–4 Jimmy White
 John Virgo 6–4 Ray Reardon
 John Virgo 6–4 Kirk Stevens
 Bill Werbeniuk 6–4 Jimmy White
 Jimmy White 6–4 David Taylor
 Eddie Charlton 6–4 Jimmy White
 Eddie Charlton 6–4 David Taylor
 Eddie Charlton 7–3 John Virgo
 Eddie Charlton 8–2 Tony Knowles
 Alex Higgins 5–5 David Taylor
 Doug Mountjoy 7–3 Bill Werbeniuk
 Doug Mountjoy 9–1 David Taylor
 John Spencer 5–5 John Virgo
 Dennis Taylor 8–2 Kirk Stevens
 John Virgo 6–4 Dennis Taylor
 John Virgo 8–2 Bill Werbeniuk
 Jimmy White 6–4 Ray Reardon
 Jimmy White 6–4 Alex Higgins
 Alex Higgins 6–4 Dennis Taylor
 Alex Higgins 7–3 Bill Werbeniuk
 Tony Knowles 5–5 Jimmy White
 Doug Mountjoy 7–3 Jimmy White
 Doug Mountjoy 7–3 Tony Knowles
 Dennis Taylor 7–3 John Spencer
 Alex Higgins 5–5 Ray Reardon
 Alex Higgins 7–3 Eddie Charlton
 Tony Knowles 6–4 John Spencer
 Doug Mountjoy 5–5 John Virgo
 Ray Reardon 6–4 Bill Werbeniuk
 Kirk Stevens *–* Eddie Charlton
 Kirk Stevens *–* Ray Reardon
 Kirk Stevens *–* David Taylor
 Kirk Stevens *–* Bill Werbeniuk
 Dennis Taylor 7–3 Jimmy White
 Dennis Taylor 7–3 Ray Reardon
 John Virgo 6–4 Tony Knowles

References

Premier League Snooker
1984 in snooker
1984 in British sport